Sultanov is a Turkic masculine surname common in the former Soviet Union, its feminine counterpart is Sultanova. The name derives from Sultan which means "power" or "authority".

It may refer to:

 Afag Sultanova (born 1987), Azerbaijani Paralympic judoka
 Agabey Sultanov (1938–2007), Azerbaijani psychiatrist, scholar and public activist
 Alexei Sultanov (1969–2005), Russian-American classical pianist of Uzbek origin
 Ayna Sultanova (1895–1938), Azerbaijani Communist party activist and statesperson
 Bakhyt Sultanov (born 1971), Kazakhstani politician
 Ceyhun Sultanov (born 1979), Azerbaijani football player 
 Elman Sultanov (born 1974), Azerbaijani football player 
 Firiya Sultanova (born 1961), Russian long-distance runner
 Hamid Sultanov (1889-1939), pro-Soviet Azerbaijani politician and husband of Ayna Sultanova
 Jeyhun Sultanov (born 1979), Azerbaijani footballer
 Khosrov bey Sultanov (1879–1947), Azerbaijani politician and general
 Rain Sultanov (born 1965), Azerbaijani jazz musician
 Sanzhar Sultanov (born 1988), Kazakhstani film director
 Shahin Sultanov, Azerbaijani admiral
 Ulduz Sultanov (born 1974), Azerbaijani judoka

Surnames